During the Parade of Nations, at the opening ceremony of the 2014 Winter Paralympics, athletes from each participating country paraded in the Fisht Olympic Stadium, preceded by its flag. The flag was borne by a sportsperson from that country chosen either by the National Paralympic Committee or by the athletes themselves.

Parade order
All nations paraded in alphabetical order of the Russian alphabet except the host country, the Russian Federation, who entered last.

Countries and flag bearers 
The following is a list of all parading countries with their respective flag bearer, sorted in the order they appeared in the parade.  This is sortable by country name under which they entered, the flag bearer's name, or the flag bearer's sport. Names are given as were officially designated by the IPC.

See also
 2014 Winter Olympics national flag bearers

References

Parade of Nations
Lists of Paralympic flag bearers
Parades in Russia